Zhusheng Temple is a Buddhist temple located at the foot of Mount Heng, in Nanyue District of Hengyang, Hunan, China. It was inscribed to the National Key Buddhist Temples in Han Chinese Area's list in 1983.

History
Zhusheng Temple was first construction as "Mituotai" during the Tang dynasty (618-907) by master Chengyuan, the Third Patriarch of Pure Land Buddhism. In 779, Emperor Daizong of Tang inscribed and honored the name "Bozhou Daochang". During the Zhenyuan period of Emperor Dezong of Tang (785-805), the Tang emperor named the temple "Mituo Temple". Since Emperor Wuzong (814-846) of the Tang dynasty (618-907) who was a staunch Taoist, he ordered to demolish Buddhist temples, confiscate temple lands and force monks to return to secular life. This was known as "Huichang Suppression of Buddhism". The temple was completely destroyed in the movement.

During the period of Five Dynasties and Ten Reigns (930-960), King Wumu of Chu Ma Yin rebuilt the temple and named it "Baoguo Temple".

During the Taiping Xingguo period (968-976) of Song dynasty (960-1279), Emperor Taizong of Song renamed it "Shengye Temple". In 1119, Emperor Huizong of Song who was a staunch Taoist ordered to convert the Buddhist temple into a Taoist temple and named it "Shenxiao Palace".

During the Yuan dynasty (1271-1368), Shengye Temple was enlarged burned, and consecrated several times.

In 1635, during the late Ming dynasty (1368-1644), abbot Foding renovated the temple. 

In 1705, in the 44th year of Kangxi period of Qing dynasty (1644-1911), Kangxi Emperor made an inspection trip in the south, Zhao Shenqiao, provincial governor of Hunan, changed the temple to a Royal palace, but Kangxi Emperor didn't come here. In 1713, Kangxi Emperor gave the temple a set of Dragon-store Tripiṭaka. In 1727, in the 5th year of Yongzheng period, Yongzheng Emperor renamed the temple "Zhusheng Temple", and has continued to this day.

During the early Republic period (1911-1949), Master Kongye established a branch of Tiantai school here. In 1929, Master Lingtao founded the "Buddhist Institute of Mount Heng" here. On May 7, 1937, Ye Jianying organised the Rescue Association of Mount Heng Buddhism and Taoism here.

After the establishment of PRC in 1956, the Buddhist Association of Mount Heng was set up here. During the disastrous Cultural Revolution, the red guards had attacked the temple. Buddhist scriptures, valuable historical documents, and other works of art were either stolen, damaged or destroyed, many original Buddha statues and musical instruments in the temple had been damaged or lost, but the buildings and halls remained intact. In 1979, according to the national policy of free religious belief, Zhusheng Temple was reconstructed and reopened. It has been designated as a National Key Buddhist Temple in Han Chinese Area in 1983.

Architecture
Along the central axis of the temple stand five buildings including shanmen, Hall of Four Heavenly Kings, Mahavira Hall, Dharma Hall and Abbot's Room.

Mahavira Hall
The Mahavira Hall is the third hall in the temple. In the center of the temple enshrines the statue of Sakyamuni with Amitabha standing on the left and Bhaisajyaguru on the right.

Gallery

References

External links

Buddhist temples in Hunan
Nanyue District